Gökbakar is a Turkish surname. Notable people with the surname include:

 Şahan Gökbakar (born 1980), Turkish comedian, actor, and producer
 Togan Gökbakar (born 1984), Turkish film director

Turkish-language surnames